Local elections were held in the city of Angeles on May 13, 2013, in conjunction with the 2013 Philippine midterm elections.  Registered voters of the city will be electing candidates for the following elective local posts: city mayor, city vice mayor, and ten councilors.

As Angeles City is a highly urbanized city, its voters do note vote for Pampanga elective officials; however, they participate in electing the province's first district representative.  That district also includes the city of Mabalacat and the municipality of Magalang, all component local government units of the province.

Results
The candidates for mayor and vice mayor with the highest number of votes win their respective seats. They are elected separately; therefore, they may be of different parties when elected.

Mayor
Edgardo Pamintuan Sr. is the incumbent. he is challenge by 1st District Congressman Carmelo Lazatin.

Vice Mayor
Maria Vicente Vega-Cabigting is the incumbent. Her opponents is 2 councilors Joseph Alfie Bonifacio and Jesus Sangil, Barangay Balibago Chairman Rodelio Mamac, Sr. and Mark Allen Sison.

City Councilors

Voting is via plurality-at-large voting:  Voters will vote for ten (10) candidates and the ten candidates with the highest number of votes are elected.

Results

|-bgcolor=black
|colspan=5|

External links
Official website of the Commission on Elections
 Official website of National Movement for Free Elections (NAMFREL)
Official website of the Parish Pastoral Council for Responsible Voting (PPCRV)

2013 Philippine local elections
Elections in Pampanga
Angeles City